Steven R. Goldstein is an inventor, author and a professor of obstetrics and gynecology at NYU School of Medicine. He is the director of NYU’s Gynecological Ultrasound and the co-director of the Bone Densitometry and Body Composition Unit.

Early life and education
Goldstein was born and raised in Passaic, New Jersey. He graduated from Passaic High School in 1967 where one of his best friends and classmates was the actor, Alan Rosenberg.

He is a Magna Cum Laude graduate of Colgate University with a Baccalaureate degree in biology. He graduated from New York University School of Medicine in 1975.

Career 
After graduating from the New York University School of Medicine in 1975, he completed an internship in obstetrics and gynecology at Parkland Memorial Hospital in Dallas, Texas from 1975-1976. He then completed a residency in obstetrics and gynecology at NYU Affiliated Hospitals/Bellevue Hospital Center from 1976 to 1980. In 1980 he joined the faculty of the Department of Obstetrics and Gynecology at NYU School of Medicine. He also maintains a half-time private practice as a generalist in obstetrics and gynecology in the faculty practice suites at NYU Langone Medical Center. Clinically, his practice has evolved, focusing more on menopausal and perimenopausal medicine with particular emphasis in ultrasound applications both for adnexal masses and abnormal bleeding.

Goldstein is a fellow of the American Institute of Ultrasound in Medicine and is currently president of this national organization. He is a past president of the North American Menopause Society. He served on the board of directors of the American Registry of Diagnostic Medical Sonographers, having prepared the test and administered policy for the certification of over 40,000 sonographers nationwide. He is a past chairman of the American College of Obstetrics and Gynecology, New York Section. He was author of their technical bulletin Ultrasound in Gynecology as well as the author of their practice guidelines on SERMs (Selective Estrogen Receptor Moderators). He serves as the liaison physician  from the American College of Obstetrics and Gynecology to the Women’s Health Imaging Panel of the American College of Radiology. He has been an examiner for the American Board of Obstetrics and Gynecology.

Writing 
Goldstein has authored such textbooks as Endovaginal Ultrasound and Ultrasound in Gynecology. More recently, he wrote Gynecologic Ultrasound: A Problem Based Approach, Imaging in the Infertile Couple and Textbook of Perimenopausal Gynecology. He is the author of more than 60 chapters in textbooks and over 80 original research articles . His work has gained him recognition worldwide, and he is one of the most highly regarded individuals in the field of vaginal probe ultrasound. Because of his expertise, Dr. Goldstein has been invited to serve in roles such as guest faculty member, invited speaker, visiting professor, and course director over 400 times in the United States and across the world.
This past October, Dr. Goldstein was made an honorary fellow of the Royal College of Obstetricians and Gynecologists in London. Only 26 Americans have received this honor since 1946. In 2014, the Association of Professors in Gynecology and Obstetrics bestowed upon him the outstanding teacher award in obstetrics and gynecology for the NYU School of Medicine, where he currently serves as the associate director of the clinical clerkship.

Pharmaceutical advisory 
Goldstein has a long history as an advisor and consultant to the pharmaceutical industry. He has been on gynecologic advisory boards and/or consulted for Amgen, Bayer, Boehringer Ingelheim, Eli Lilly, Merck, GlaxoSmithKline, Novo Nordisk, Wyeth, Procter & Gamble, Warner Chilcott, Shionogi, QuatRx, Depomed, and Pfizer. He has represented Eli Lilly, Pfizer and Mirabilis Medical and their appearances before FDA Advisory Boards. He has designed studies of uterine safety for Eli Lilly, Wyeth, Pfizer, and Glaxo Smith Kline. He holds two patents in the medical device arena. He has been a director of a publicly traded ultrasound company, Sonosite, Inc. from its inception until its sale to Fuji Medical in 2012.

Personal life 
Goldstein resides in New York City and Saltaire, NY.

References

Year of birth missing (living people)
Living people
American gynecologists
New York University faculty
Colgate University alumni
New York University Grossman School of Medicine alumni
People from Passaic, New Jersey